Raybank is a former Turkish bank.

It was founded in 1956. The name of the bank ray  means "rail" and the main shareholder was the Turkish State Railways staff charity fund with 29%. However, in 1963, the bank was liquidated under the supervision of Emlak Kredi Bank, a public bank.

References

Banks established in 1956
Banks disestablished in 1963
Defunct banks of Turkey
Turkish companies established in 1956
1963 disestablishments in Turkey